This is a list of notable events in Latin music (i.e. Spanish- and Portuguese-speaking music from Latin America, Europe, and the United States) that took place in 1993.

Events 
February 24 – The 35th Annual Grammy Awards are held at the Shrine Auditorium in Los Angeles, California.
Jon Secada wins the Grammy Award for Best Latin Pop Album for his album Otro Día Más Sin Verte.
Linda Ronstadt wins the Grammy Award for Best Tropical Latin Album for her album Frenesí
Linda Ronstadt wins the Grammy Award for Best Mexican-American Album for her album Mas Canciones.
May 19 – The American Society of Composers, Authors and Publishers inaugurates its El Premio ASCAP, an annual award ceremony dedicated to Latin songwriters and composers.
May 20 – The 5th Annual Lo Nuestro Awards are held at the James L. Knight Center in Miami, Florida. Jon Secada and Selena are the biggest winners on the award ceremony with both receiving three awards.
July 10 – Billboard establishes the Top Latin Albums chart, which ranks the bestselling Latin albums in the United States. Rather than rely on retailers for sales report as previously done on its subcharts, Billboard compiles the chart by obtaining sales data from Nielsen SoundScan. Mi Tierra by Gloria Estefan becomes the first number-one album on the chart.

Bands formed 
Ivy Queen (Reggaeton)
Los Fantasmas del Caribe
Marc Anthony (Salsa)
Víctor Manuelle (Salsa)
Jay Perez

Bands reformed 
Selena Y Los Dinos

Bands disbanded

Bands on hiatus

Number-ones albums and singles by country 
List of number-one albums of 1993 (Spain)
List of number-one singles of 1993 (Spain)
List of number-one Billboard Top Latin Albums of 1993
List of number-one Billboard Hot Latin Tracks of 1993

Awards 
1993 Premio Lo Nuestro
1993 Tejano Music Awards

Albums released

First quarter

January

February

March

Second quarter

April

May

June

Third quarter

July

August

September

Fourth quarter

October

November

December

Unknown

Best-selling records

Best-selling albums
The following is a list of the top 5 best-selling Latin albums of 1993 in the United States in the categories of Latin pop, Regional Mexican, and Tropical/salsa, according to Billboard.

Best-performing songs
The following is a list of the top 10 best-performing Latin songs in the United States in 1995, according to Billboard.

Births 
January 10Rauw Alejandro, Puerto Rican rapper
February 3Lalo Ebratt, Colombian reggaeton singer
March 30 – Anitta, Brazilian singer, songwriter, actress, dancer and record producer
April 9Jhayco, Puerto Rican rapper
December 3Sech, Panamanian trap singer
December 16Cazzu, Argentine rapper

Deaths 
June 29 – Héctor Lavoe, Puerto Rican salsa singer
August 14 – , Argentine tango composer

References 

 
Latin music by year